Ostenoteuthidae is an extinct family of cephalopods from Lower Jurassic of Italy. They had ten arms with unusual structure.

Both known species are from Lower Sinemurian.

The type locality for up to date known two species is near village Osteno, Lake Lugano, Province of Como, northern Italy. Eight specimens from this family are stored in Museo Civico di Storia Naturale di Milano in Milan, Italy.

Genera 

 Ostenoteuthis Garassino & Donovan, 2000
 Ostenoteuthis siroi Garassino & Donovan, 2000 - from Lower Sinemurian. ( photo)
 Uncinoteuthis Garassino & Donovan, 2000
 Uncinoteuthis cuvieri Garassino & Donovan, 2000 - from Lower Sinemurian.

References 

Prehistoric cephalopod families
Prehistoric animals of Europe
Jurassic cephalopods
Sinemurian first appearances
Early Jurassic extinctions